Kevin S. Brown is the eleventh and current bishop of the Episcopal Church in the U.S. state of Delaware, presiding over the Episcopal Diocese of Delaware.

Biography 
Brown was raised in Asheville, North Carolina. He studied at Duke University and graduated with a double major in Psychology and Mathematics in 1991. In 1996, he graduated with a Master of Business Administration from the University of West Florida. He also served as an Acquisitions Officer in the United States Air Force, after which he moved to Memphis, Tennessee, where he worked in finance and marketing.

He earned his Master of Divinity from the General Theological Seminary in 2007 and was ordained deacon and priest. That same year, he became rector of Grace Church in Paris, Tennessee, and in 2010 became rector of the Church of the Holy Comforter in Charlotte, North Carolina. He was elected on July 15, 2017, on the fifth ballot, and was consecrated on December 9, 2017, by Presiding Bishop Michael Curry. He received a Doctor of Divinity from General Theological Seminary.

References

External links 
 The Episcopal Church in Delaware

Bishops in Delaware
Year of birth missing (living people)
Living people
People from Asheville, North Carolina
Duke University alumni
University of West Florida alumni
General Theological Seminary alumni
Episcopal bishops of Delaware